Percy Kelly (1918–1993) was a Cumbrian artist, footballer, post office worker and transvestite.  He is most famous for his drawings and paintings which he hoarded during his lifetime – "They are so important to me I could never sell them".

References

Citations

Sources

Further reading
 Joint winner of Lakeland Book of the Year 2012; letters to Mary Burkett, director of Abbot Hall Art Gallery

External links
Percy Kelly website

1918 births
1993 deaths
Cross-dressers
English artists
British postmen
British postmasters
Workington A.F.C. players
Association footballers not categorized by position
Transgender sportspeople
LGBT association football players
English LGBT sportspeople
English footballers
20th-century English LGBT people